Nordøyan Lighthouse is a coastal lighthouse in the municipality of Nærøysund in Trøndelag, Norway. It was established in 1890 and automated in 1989. The light is powered on all year except from May 12 until July 25 due to the midnight sun in this region.

Nordøyan lighthouse stands on the islet of Surenøy, north of the Foldafjord. The white light is always on, emitting a 79,000 candela light, and every 40 seconds it flashes a much brighter 2,070,000 candela light.

See also

Lighthouses in Norway
List of lighthouses in Norway

References

External links
 Norsk Fyrhistorisk Forening 

Lighthouses completed in 1890
Lighthouses in Trøndelag
Nærøysund
Vikna